McIlroy Park is a   Local Nature Reserve in Tilehurst, a suburb of Reading in Berkshire. It is owned and managed by Reading Borough Council. Along with Blundells Copse and Lousehill Copse it is part of West Reading Woodlands.

Geography and site

McIlroy Park is located on a steep hill and features a large species-rich grassland field and a large block of mixed deciduous woodland. There are two ancient sunken paths that pass through the woodland. There are old chalk pits in the west woodland area from the old clay extraction industry and a possible Saxon mound on its eastern edge.

McIlroy Park abuts, and is contiguous with another local nature reserve called Round Copse.

History

The land for the reservation was donated by William Mcilroy, who owned a department store in Reading, and was mayor of the town.

In 1992 site was designated a local nature reserve.

Fauna

The site has the following fauna:

Birds

Red kite
Common buzzard
Common kestrel
Common starling
Common whitethroat
Fieldfare
European green woodpecker
Dunnock
House sparrow
Mistle thrush
Redwing
Song thrush
Willow warbler
Eurasian sparrowhawk
Eurasian jay

Invertebrates

Cinnabar moth
Bombus ruderarius
Scotopteryx chenopodiata
Gatekeeper
Holly blue
Meadow brown
Lycaena phlaeas
Speckled wood

Flora

The site has the following flora:

Trees

Acer campestre
Quercus robur
Fraxinus
Hazel
Ilex aquifolium
Prunus avium

Plants

Hyacinthoides non-scripta
Catnip
Mercurialis perennis
Holcus mollis
Melica uniflora
Milium effusum
Luzula pilosa
Moehringia trinervia
Calluna
Ruscus aculeatus

Fungi

Xylaria polymorpha

References

Parks and open spaces in Reading, Berkshire
Nature reserves in Berkshire
Local Nature Reserves in Berkshire